Friedrich VII Magnus of Zähringen (23 September 1647 – 25 June 1709) was the Margrave of Baden-Durlach from 1677 until his death.

Born at Ueckermünde, he was the son of Margrave Friedrich VI and Countess Palatine Christine Magdalene of Cleeburg. 
He succeeded his father as Margrave in 1677. He got involved in the Nine Years' War and after the Treaty of Ryswick in 1697, he received the title of Margrave of Basel, although it was only a formal title and he never had any real power over the Swiss city.
He again took part in the War of the Spanish Succession, as one of the leaders of the Imperial Army; some of the battles being fought in his territories.

He died at Durlach in 1709 and was succeeded in the Margraviate by his son, Charles III William, Margrave of Baden-Durlach

Marriage and issue
He married Duchess Augusta Marie of Holstein-Gottorp on 15 May 1670 in Husum. They had the following children:
 Frederick Magnus (13 January 1672 – 24 February 1672)
 Frederica Augusta (21 June 1673 – 24 July 1674)
 Christina Sophia (17 December 1674 – 22 January 1676)
 Klaudia Magdalene Elisabeth (15 November 1675 – 18 April 1676)
 Catherine (10 October 1677 – 11 August 1746), in 1701 she married Count Johann Friedrich von Leiningen-Hartenburg. Her son Frederick magnus was the father of Carl Friedrich Wilhelm, 1st Prince of Leiningen.
 Charles III William, Margrave of Baden-Durlach (17 January 1679 – 12 May 1738), he married Magdalena Wilhelmine of Württemberg
 Johanna Elisabeth (3 October 1680 – 2 July 1757), in 1697 she married Eberhard Louis, Duke of Württemberg
 Albertine Frederica (3 July 1682 – 22 December 1755), in 1704 she married Christian August of Holstein-Gottorp, Prince of Eutin
 Christopher (9 October 1684 – 2 May 1723), he married Marie Christine Felizitas zu Leiningen-Dagsburg-Falkenburg-Heidesheim
 Charlotte Sophia (1 March 1686 – 5 October 1689)
 Marie Anna (9 July 1688 – 8 March 1689)

Ancestors 

1647 births
1709 deaths
People from Ueckermünde
House of Zähringen
Margraves of Baden-Durlach